The European Society of Human Genetics (ESHG) is a non-profit organization that promotes research, facilitates communication and encourages best practice in applications of human and medical genetics, particularly in Europe.
The society organizes the annual European Human Genetics Conference and publishes the European Journal of Human Genetics.

References

Sources

1967 establishments in Austria
Biology in Europe
Genetics societies
International organisations based in Vienna
International scientific organizations based in Europe